The Bonita Channel is a shipping channel which leads northbound traffic out of the Golden Gate to the Gulf of the Farallones and Pacific Ocean.

References

Geography of Marin County, California
Geography of the San Francisco Bay Area
Transportation in the San Francisco Bay Area
West Marin
Shipping channels